Zhivko Stoyanov Petkov (born 15 February 1993) is a Bulgarian footballer who plays as a forward for F.C. Kafr Qasim.

Career
On 27 June 2012, Petkov joined Neftochimic Burgas. At Neftochimic, he became a member of the first team and his goals helped the "Sheiks" gain promotion to the A PFG during 2012–13 season. He made 23 appearances, finishing as the club's top scorer with 14 goals.

Petkov made his A PFG debut on 21 July 2013, when he came on as a half-time substitute in a 4–1 away loss against Litex Lovech.

Petkov joined Cherno More in the summer of 2014. He scored his first goal for the team from Varna on 13 September 2014, netting a late equalizer in a league match against CSKA Sofia.

On 6 July 2017, Petkov signed with Pomorie.

Honours

Club
Cherno More
 Bulgarian Cup: 2014–15
 Bulgarian Supercup: 2015

References

External links
 
 

1993 births
Living people
Sportspeople from Burgas
Bulgarian footballers
Bulgaria youth international footballers
Bulgaria under-21 international footballers
FC Pomorie players
PFC Chernomorets Burgas players
Neftochimic Burgas players
PFC Cherno More Varna players
FC Hebar Pazardzhik players
FC Sozopol players
F.C. Kafr Qasim players
First Professional Football League (Bulgaria) players
Second Professional Football League (Bulgaria) players
Liga Leumit players
Bulgarian expatriate footballers
Expatriate footballers in Israel
Bulgarian expatriate sportspeople in Israel
Association football forwards